Morpho absoloni is a Neotropical butterfly.

Description
Morpho absoloni is a large butterfly with a wingspan of approximately 100 mm. The upperside of the male forewings is fluorescent metallic blue. There is  a black mark at the apex of the wings which have a concave outer edge. The underside is brown with a line of ocelli.

Distribution
This species is present in Brazil and Peru.

References

Le Moult (E.) & Réal (P.), 1962-1963. Les Morpho d'Amérique du Sud et Centrale, Editions du cabinet entomologique E. Le Moult, Paris.

External links
Butterflies of America Images of type and other specimens
"Morpho Fabricius, 1807" at Markku Savela's Lepidoptera and Some Other Life Forms
TAXONOMY BROWSER: Morpho absoloni, Consortium for the Barcode of Life
 External image of holotype

Morpho
Nymphalidae of South America
Butterflies described in 1924
Fauna of Brazil